Dome of Doom Records (or simply Dome of Doom) is a Los Angeles-based independent record label founded in 2011 by musician and record producer Wylie Cable, that specializes in boutique physical media artifacts, producing and distributing vinyl, CD and cassette for artists globally.  Dome of Doom also distributes music digitally via Alpha Pup, and has licensed music from the catalog to HBO, Adidas, Volcom, HUF Skateboards, Oakley and more via a partnership with the independent licensing firm Wav-Pool.

Dome of Doom Records has released music by Daedelus, Marcel Rodriguez (The Mars Volta), Huxley Anne, Linaforina, Kenny Segal, QRTR, Bleep Bloop, DMVU, Holly, Jon Casey, Gothic Tropic, Dabow, DJ Ride and many more. Having just recently hit its 10-year-anniversary with the release of a celebratory compilation, Decade Of Doom.

History
In 2011, Dome of Doom Records was founded by Wylie Cable. Within the same year, he also released his debut solo album "Water Under The Bridge", under the newly founded label. Dome of Doom Records partnered with Alpha Pup for worldwide digital distribution beginning in 2015.

In 2015, they began to work more closely with Low End Theory resident and co-founder DJ Nobody. Together, they released a reissue of DJ Nobody's first album "Puzzles" from 1996, with a full B-Side of unreleased beats from that same era.  The Label went on to release more tapes for Nobody over the coming years like "Prodigal Son".

YUNG by Linafornia was released on January 22, 2016. Linafornia captured the LA Beat Scene's signature sound.

2021 marked the 10 year anniversary of the label and the Decade of Doom compilation was released digitally and on a double LP vinyl.

Artists past and present

 100 Onces
 Ahee 
 The Arthur Cable Blues Band
 Bacteria Earth
 The Blank Tapes
 BOSTN

 Daedelus
 DJ Nobody
 DMVU
 Dream Panther
 Duk
 The DeathMedicine Band
 Elusive
 Eureka The Butcher
 Eraserfase
 ELOS
 Fractalline
 Gnome Beats
 Huxley Anne
 Insects vs Robots
 Kenny Segal
 Linafornia
 LMNOP
 Los
 MC Nocando
 The Opaque
 Particle Kid
 Phedee
 Rah Zen
 Space Gang
 Speakz
 Speakpanther
 Stevie Schmidt
 Suntundra Moon
 Swisha
 Wylie Cable

References

Record labels established in 2011
American independent record labels